Onon-Balj National Park covers two sectors of the Onon River valley as it flows north from Mongolia into Russia.  The region is in the transition zone between the Siberian conifer forests of the north and the Daurian steppe and forest steppe of Mongolia.  The area is one of relatively high biodiversity, and is also historically and culturally important for its association with Genghis Khan.  The park is located in the far northeast of Khentii Province, 280 km northeast of Ulaanbataar.

Topography
The park covers mid-sized mountains and confluence of the Onon and Balj Rivers.  Elevations range from 840 meters at the Onon River, to 1,568 meters at Kentsuu Mountain.  The mountains generally have rounded tops and mild slopes.

Climate and ecoregion
The climate of the area is Cold semi-arid climate (Köppen climate classification (BSk)). This climate is characteristic of steppe climates intermediary between desert humid climates, and typically have precipitation is above evapotranspiration.  At least one month averages below .  The park is in southern extent of the Trans-Baikal conifer forests ecoregion.

Flora and fauna
Vegetation varies with river courses - willow groves, floodplain and riparian forests - and with altitude on the mountains - steppe and forest steppe.  The forests are characterized by pine and larch trees.  A significant threat to habitat in the park is currently forest fires. Birds known to breed in the park include the vulnerable Swan Goose (Anser cygnoides), Lesser kestrel (Falco naumanni), and the vulnerable White-naped crane (Antigone vipio).  Mammals include the Daurian ground squirrel and the Raccoon dog.

See also
 List of national parks of Mongolia
 Sokhondo Nature Reserve

References

External links
 Park borders, Onon-Balj National Park - Sector B, ProtectedPlanet.net

National parks of Mongolia